"Take the Long Way Home" is a song written by Doug Crider and Johnny Neel, and recorded by actor and American country music artist John Schneider.  It was released in December 1986 as the second single and title track from the album Take the Long Way Home.  The song reached number 10 on the Billboard Hot Country Singles & Tracks chart.

Chart performance

References

1987 singles
1986 songs
John Schneider (screen actor) songs
Songs written by Johnny Neel
Song recordings produced by Jimmy Bowen
MCA Records singles